Cedestis is a genus of moths of the family Yponomeutidae.

Species
Cedestis exiguata - Moriuti, 1977
Cedestis gysseleniella - Zeller, 1839
Cedestis leucopterostigmatis - J.C. Sohn & C.S. Wu, 2010
Cedestis subfasciella - Stephens,  (syn: Cedestis farinatella Zeller, 1839 )

References

Yponomeutidae
Moth genera